James Millar may refer to:

James Millar (artist) (c. 1735–1805), English portrait painter
James Millar (educationalist) (1893–1989), Scottish educationalist
James Millar (physician) (1762–1827), Scottish physician and editor of the Encyclopædia Britannica
James Millar (Australian actor) (born 1980), Australian actor, singer and writer
James Duncan Millar (1871–1932), Scottish barrister and Liberal, later National Liberal, politician
James R. Millar (1936–2008), American economist
James Millar (loyalist) (born 1966), Northern Irish loyalist paramilitary
James D. Millar (1869–1948), American teacher, bookkeeper, businessman and politician
James Broom Millar, British Foreign Service personnel and media executive
James Millar (judoka) in 2009 European Judo Championships
James Millar (skier), Paralympian who represented Australia at the Winter Olympics in 2006 and 2010

See also
Jimmy Millar (disambiguation)
James Miller (disambiguation)